Kevin A. Menicoche (born October 7, 1961) is a former member of the legislature and former cabinet minister in the Northwest Territories, Canada.

Political career
Menicoche ran for a seat in the 2003 Northwest Territories general election and defeated seven other candidates with 34% of the vote to win the Nahendeh electoral district. Menicoche was appointed to the Executive Council in October 2006 and served as the Minister of Transportation and Minister Responsible for the Public Utilities Board portfolios.

He was re-elected in the 2007 Northwest Territories general election, and was a regular member.

References

External links
Kevin Menicoche Legislature biography

Living people
1961 births
21st-century Canadian politicians
21st-century First Nations people
Dene people
First Nations politicians
Members of the Legislative Assembly of the Northwest Territories
University of Toronto alumni